The 1978 NCAA Division I-AA football season was the first season of Division I-AA college football; Division I-AA was created in 1978 when Division I was subdivided into Division I-A and Division I-AA for football only. With the exception of seven teams from the Southwestern Athletic Conference (SWAC), Division I teams from the 1977 season played in Division I-A during the 1978 season. The SWAC teams, along with five conferences and five other teams formerly in Division II, played in Division I-AA.

The Division I-AA season began in August 1978 and concluded with the 1978 NCAA Division I-AA Football Championship Game played on December 16 at Memorial Stadium in Wichita Falls, Texas. The Florida A&M Rattlers won the first I-AA championship, defeating the UMass Minutemen in the Pioneer Bowl, 35–28. Florida A&M of 1978 remains the only team from an HBCU to play in the I-AA/FCS national championship game.

Conference realignment

Conference changes
 Five conferences, the Big Sky Conference, Mid-Eastern Athletic Conference, Ohio Valley Conference, Southwestern Athletic Conference, and Yankee Conference, transitioned from Division II to the newly-established Division I-AA level of college football. All of their members, alongside eight independents, changed divisions at the same time.

Membership changes

Conference standings

Conference champions

Postseason

NCAA Division I-AA playoff bracket
The bracket consisted of three regional selections (West, East, and South) plus an at-large team. Florida A&M (FAMU) of the Southern Intercollegiate Athletic Conference (SIAC) was the at-large selection. While the SIAC was a Division II conference, FAMU had successfully petitioned the NCAA for Division I classification (Division I-AA in football), which took effect on September 1, 1978.

* Denotes host institution

See also
 1978 NCAA Division I-AA football rankings
 1978 NCAA Division I-A football season
 1978 NCAA Division II football season
 1978 NCAA Division III football season
 1978 NAIA Division I football season
 1978 NAIA Division II football season

References